The 1984–85 USC Trojans men's basketball team represented the University of Southern California during the 1984–85 NCAA Division I men's basketball season. Led by head coach Stan Morrison, they played their home games at the L. A. Sports Arena in Los Angeles, California as members of the Pac-10 Conference. The Trojans were 13–5 in the Pac-10 and, after falling to Oregon State at home in the regular season finale, shared the conference championship with Washington. USC received a bid to the NCAA tournament as No. 8 seed in the Midwest region where they fell to Illinois State in the opening round.

Senior forward Wayne Carlander was named Pac-10 Player of the Year and First-team All-conference in back-to-back seasons.

Previous season
The 1983–84 USC Trojans men's basketball team finished 8th in the Pac-10 standings at 6–12. The teams overall record was 11–20 in head coach Stan Morrisons fifth season at the helm. Junior forward Wayne Carlander was recognized as a First-team All-conference performer.

Roster

Schedule and results

|-
!colspan=9 style=| Non-conference regular season

|-
!colspan=9 style=| Pac-10 regular season

|-
!colspan=9 style=| NCAA Tournament

Rankings

Awards and honors
Wayne Carlander – Pac-10 Player of the Year

References

Usc Trojans
USC Trojans men's basketball seasons
USC
USC Trojans
USC Trojans